Aoife MacMurrough (c. 1145 – 1188), also known by later historians as Eva of Leinster, was an Irish noblewoman, Princess of Leinster and Countess of Pembroke. She was the daughter of Dermot MacMurrough (c. 1110 – 1171), King of Leinster, and his second wife, Mór Ní Tuathail or Mor O'Toole (c. 1114 – 1191), and a niece of Archbishop of Dublin St Lawrence O'Toole.

Life
As the daughter of a Gaelic king, the young Aoife would have been raised in much higher dignity than most other girls in Ireland who were of poorer stock than she; her privileged status ensured that she was educated in the law of the land and would have ensured that she was literate in Church-Latin. Since her mother (who also produced one son and another daughter) was the second wife of Diarmait, her station was automatically lower than that of her husband's first wife, Sadb Ní Faeláin, and her issue of two sons and one daughter. It has been asserted by some historians that the children of the second wife were illegitimate as per the European laws which specified that marriage was a contract between one man and one woman and until the death of either party – this was not the case in Ireland, where the Brehon law allowed two wives, trial marriages and divorce was quite normal. Aoife's brother Domhnall succeeded their father to the kingship of Leinster after his election by the family "derbfine".

On 25 August 1170, following the Norman invasion of Ireland that her father had requested, she was married to Richard de Clare, 2nd Earl of Pembroke, better known as Strongbow, the leader of the Norman invasion force, in Christchurch cathedral in Waterford. Her father, Dermot MacMurrough, who was seeking a military alliance with Strongbow in his feud with the King of Breffni, Tiernan O'Rourke, had promised Aoife to Pembroke. However, according to Brehon law, both the man and the woman had to consent to the marriage, so it is fair to conclude that Aoife accepted her father's arrangements.

Under Anglo-Norman law, this gave Strongbow succession rights to the Kingdom of Leinster. Under Irish Brehon law, the marriage gave her a life interest only, after which any land would normally revert to male cousins; but Brehon law also recognised a transfer of "swordland" following a conquest. Aoife led troops in battle and is sometimes known as Red Eva.

She had two sons and a daughter with her husband Richard de Clare and through their daughter, Isabel de Clare, within a few generations their descendants included much of the nobility of Europe including all the monarchs of Scotland since Robert I (1274–1329) and all those of England, Great Britain and the United Kingdom since Henry IV (1367–1413); and, apart from Anne of Cleves, all the queen consorts of, as well as, Henry VIII.

Death
While the exact date of the death of Aoife of Leinster is unknown (one suggested year is 1188), there is in existence one tale of her demise. As a young woman, she lived many years following the death of Strongbow in 1176, and devoted herself to raising their children and defending their territory.

Issue

See also

 Aoife

References

Sources
O Croinin, Daibhi (1995) Early Medieval Ireland 400–1200 London: Longman Press; p. 281
Salmonson, Jessica Amanda (1991) The Encyclopedia of Amazons. Paragon House. Page 160. 
Weis, Frederick Lewis Ancestral Roots of Certain American Colonists Who Came to America Before 1700, Lines: 66–26, 175–7, 261–30

1140s births
1188 deaths
12th-century Irish people
People from County Wexford
Medieval Gaels from Ireland
12th-century Irish women
MacMorrough Kavanagh dynasty
Women in 12th-century warfare
Irish expatriates in England
Women in medieval European warfare
Irish princesses
Gaels
Women in war in Ireland
Pembroke